Per Albin Hansson (28 October 1885 – 6 October 1946) was a Swedish politician, chairman of the Social Democrats from 1925 and two-time Prime Minister in four governments between 1932 and 1946, governing all that period save for a short-lived crisis in the summer of 1936, which he ended by forming a coalition government with his main adversary, Axel Pehrsson-Bramstorp.

Political deed
Per Albin Hansson During World War II, in which Sweden maintained a policy of neutrality, he presided over a government of national unity that included all major parties in the Riksdag with the exception of the Communist Party. Forging the Social Democratic grip on Swedish politics that would last throughout the century, Hansson left an astounding legacy on his party as well as creating the idea of Sweden to become "Folkhemmet", "The People's Home". This remained intact until the early 1990s, including a strict policy of neutrality, a wide-stretching welfare state through parliamentary legislation, and reformist social corporatism rather than Marxist socialization of the means of production. Following the war, Hansson formed a Social Democratic cabinet enjoying absolute majority in the Riksdag before succumbing to a heart attack on his way home from work late at night on 6 October 1946.

During Hansson's fourteen years as Prime Minister of Sweden, a wide range of reforms were realised, such as subsidised dental care, income-tested child allowances for invalidity pensioners and widows, maternity allowances through voluntary sickness insurance, and a 1935 law that introduced state subsidies for the construction of apartment houses for families with three or more children, combined with housing allowances for families with more than two children living in these houses. 

A bill that provided for "the establishment of a voluntary unemployment insurance scheme was passed into law and came into force on 1 January 1935." The Government also allocated funds for the improvement of rural housing. An Act of 26 June 1936 amended that of 1929 "so as to include all the diseases contained in the revised Convention, as well as those due to carbon monoxide, cyanogen and its compounds, chlorine, nitrous fumes, chromic acid and its compounds, and certain infectious diseases (hospital staffs, etc.)." A People's Travel Association was founded for workers and their families in March 1937. An Act of 11 September 1936 "contains a new regulation of the right of association and collective bargaining. The Act applies not only to workers in private undertakings but also to employees in the service of the State or the communes who have not the status of officials." On 1 November 1936 an Act came into force "regulating hours of work on farms employing more than four workers, exclusive of cattle tenders. The maximum working day is 10 hours, and the net working week may vary from 46 to 56 hours in the course of the year." According to one study, the years 1937 to 1939 became "a harvest season for a series of social reforms that previously for the most part were dreams for the future." Writing on these years, Hansson stated that "1937 loosened things up.  That is when a pension amendment indexed to the cost of living was enacted, child support, mothers’ assistance, maternity assistance, far-reaching improvements in preventative mother and child care, the housing loan fund. The regulation of farm labor was approved. 1938 gave us compulsory holidays, the national dental plan, and the Institute for Health Insurance. 1939 saw the regulation of working hours … [and] housing for pensioners was created for the aged." An Act to provide for 12 days of annual holiday with pay for workers passed the Riksdag on  2 June 1938, while a Royal Notification of 2 December 1938 "deals with medical inspection of workers exposed to silicosis, referring to: examination on engagement and annually thereafter; practical methods to be followed; medical authorities entrusted with examination; recording of results on the health register, etc."  The Workers' Protection Act of 1912 was "amended and extended to cover certain aspects of hygiene and protection for young persons even in the smaller undertakings, as well as medical examination for adults on engagement and periodically thereafter in the case of particularly unhealthy trades, notably those involving exposure to lead poisoning and to silicosis." Also, under legislation of ("Act of 3 June 1938, notification of 17 June 1938") "compensation has been extended to cover forms of dermatitis due to the use of chlorinated derivatives of phenol for impregnating wood." A 1938 Act amended the Workers' Protection Act, with an Institute of Social Hygiene set up; one of its duties being the study of maternity protection. An Act of 1938 authorised "loans and grants for the erection of roomy accommodation for large families living in overcrowded buildings in rural districts." The 48-hour week "has been extended to cover the staff in lunatic asylums and the Government has fixed the increases in staff which this reform involves." The Holidays with Pay Act, which was promulgated on 17 June 1938, "contains special provisions for home workers." This Act "introduced a legal system of annual holidays with pay in the country. The Act, which is of general application, grants one working day's holiday for every month of service after one year, provided that at least 180 days have been worked in the same undertaking and at least 16 days per month; the Act may not be used to invalidate any more favourable conditions contained in collective agreements. For seamen in particular the payment during the holiday includes wages and an allowance for food. Changes in the ownership of the vessel and interruptions of service for which the seaman is not responsible do not affect the right to the holiday." 

A new Act fixed hours of work for employees in commerce. From 1 January 1939 the working hours for nursing and domestic staff were 48 in the week, and on 10 March 1939 "the Government presented a Bill to amend the Act of 16 May 1930 on hours of work in bakeries. The proposed amendments would enable Sweden to ratify the international Convention on the subject. They suppressed the exemption of family undertakings from the scope of the Act and the provisions under which the Act applied only to the production of bread and pastry for sale. The Bill was passed by Parliament on 11 May 1939." Instructions concerning the inspectorates for electrical installations, explosives and ships were published on 30 June 1939 and other instructions on the inspection of lifts on 13 December 1939. Three Royal Notifications of 26 January 1940 "amended the existing regulations on the special inspection of the State railways, private railways and explosive substances." The war risks of seamen in the event of accidents were dealt with in an Act of 11 June 1937, which provided "for a very considerable increase in the accident benefits normally due to seamen if the injury or death results from an act of war. In the event of total incapacity or death the individual is entitled to a lump sum which, in the case of officers, is generally equal to twelve months' salary, and in the case of all other ratings, 4,800 kr. For partial incapacity the sum is proportionately reduced." An Act of 14 October 1939 provided that "no person may be discharged from employment on account of military or other service which he is required by law to perform. The parties may however agree to override this rule if the military service is to last more than three months." An Act of 19 May 1939 prohibited employers "from discharging, owing to engagement or marriage, any wage earner with at least two years' continuous service in the undertaking. Any agreement to the contrary is null and void and an employer who contravenes this rule must pay damages. The Act applies to undertakings employing at least three persons."

Early life and career

Per Albin Hansson was born in Kulladal, a neighborhood in Malmö, Sweden, on 28 October 1885.

One of the first professional politicians of Sweden, Hansson participated in the creation of the Swedish Social Democratic Youth in 1903 and presided over it as its chairman in 1908–09, a period in which universal suffrage and proportional representation was gradually to be enacted for all Swedish males by Conservative Prime Minister Arvid Lindman, later a rival of Hansson. Influenced generally by Karl Kautsky's views on socialism, Hansson succeeded Hjalmar Branting as editor of Social-Demokraten in 1917 and was appointed his Minister of Defence in Sweden's first Social Democratic cabinet in 1920, following a Liberal-Social Democratic coalition enacting equal suffrage for men and women (in effect as of the 1921 election). Per Albin Hansson held this office in all of Branting's three cabinets between 1920 and 1925 (years which saw eight governments), performing numerous cut-backs on the military budget. Upon Branting's death in 1925, Hansson rose to be embraced as chairman of the party. His legitimacy remained under dispute, however, and only in 1927 did he become the head of the Riksdag faction, before having been confirmed undisputedly as Branting's successor in a 1928 congress.

Upon losing power to Carl Gustaf Ekman's pro-prohibition Liberals in 1926, Hansson worked from the opposition bench and, although heading what was to remain the largest party of the Riksdag to date, faced a major setback upon cooperating with the Communists in the infamous election of 1928. Hansson's party did poorly as a result, and not until the 2010 election would the Social Democrats and the Communists (the latter changed its name, in 1995, to the Left Party) would the two parties run in tandem again.

In opposition to the Conservative – though equally pragmatic and staunchly anti-fascist – Lindman cabinet, Hansson pressed for the introduction of a welfare state rather than wide-scale nationalizations. He called his vision Folkhemmet ("the People's Home") in a Riksdag debate in 1928.

Following the fall of Ekman in 1932 due to a corruption scandal involving the recently deceased industrialist Ivar Kreuger, the Social Democrats made gains, which altogether gave them 104 Riksdag seats and 41.7% of the popular vote. Though this left them short of a majority, they benefited from the inability of the Liberal parties (themselves unable to form a single faction until 1934), the Conservatives and the Agrarians to form a stable administration of their own. This inability gave Hansson his chance. He courted and eventually obtained support from the Farmers' League, through promising an agriculture policy favoring the interests of the League (kohandeln), although he stopped short of giving League parliamentarians any cabinet posts.

In June 1936, the combined efforts of the Liberals, the Conservatives and the Agrarians brought the Hansson-led government to an end and ensured Hansson's own resignation as Prime Minister. Following Hansson's departure, League chairman Axel Pehrsson-Bramstorp was able to form a three-month "Vacation Cabinet". That lasted until the elections in September, which saw a rise in support of the Social Democrats. This time Hansson invited certain League members into the cabinet, and Pehrsson-Brahmstorp therefore became Minister of Agriculture. The administration enjoyed a substantial parliamentary majority that lasted until 1939.

World War II
Following the German-Soviet invasion of Poland in 1939, Hansson declared strict neutrality and called for the formation of a broad coalition government involving all major parties under his leadership, which was realized in December except only the pro-Stalinist Communist Party and its short-lived pro-German splinter faction, the Socialist Party. Alone in Europe save for Spain, Portugal, Switzerland, Ireland and the Vatican, Sweden maintained neutrality throughout all World War II, but like the mentioned countries, cooperated and traded with both sides. Winston Churchill claimed that Sweden during World War II ignored the greater moral issues and played both sides for profit, a criticism mimicked in criticism towards Sweden's policy towards the German occupation of Denmark and Norway upheld partly by transportation reinforcement through Swedish territory, sanctioned by Hansson's cabinet.

The German invasion of the Soviet Union on 22 June 1941, Operation Barbarossa sparked an ultimatum known as the Midsommarkrisen by the government of Nazi Germany to Hansson's cabinet, demanding some military concessions, including German troop transports on Swedish railways in order to support Germany's ally Finland. Political deliberations surrounding this ultimatum have been dubbed the "midsummer crisis", which ultimately, allegedly following King Gustav V's decision to resign should the concessions not be made, fell out in favor of the Axis. The 83-year-old king formally (although having not directly intervened in the government's policies since 1914) had the powers to appoint his own cabinet, and his open intervention in the issue was seen as a threat to the stability of the government and, given the ongoing war, to the sovereignty of the nation.

Recent research by Carl-Gustaf Scott argues however that there never was a "crisis" and that "the crisis was created in historical hindsight in order to protect the political legacy of the Social Democratic Party and its leader Per Albin Hansson."

To get the steel required by the German Ruhr and Upper Silesia industry, Germany was, in 1939–1940, dependent on shipments of Swedish iron ore, since access to the supplies from the mines in France, the traditional supplier, were cut off until the invasion of France. In 1939–1940 the Allies tried various ways to stop the shipments of Swedish ore, for example by mining Norwegian territorial waters.

In effect, the main political priority was to avoid direct war engagement of Sweden during World War II. Following Germany's setbacks around 1942–43, Sweden was no longer seriously threatened by an invasion from Nazi Germany and subsequently rolled back most of its concessions.

Death and political legacy
Following the surrender of Germany, Hansson wanted to maintain a Social Democratic-led coalition government of all non-Communist parties. However, he failed to achieve this as a result of strong opposition within his own party which favoured a radical reformist agenda following the war. Hansson reluctantly agreed to a single-party government. He had abandoned his early revolutionary and strictly anti-militarist views in favor of social corporatism, class collaboration and a reformist agenda involving few nationalizations but stable armed forces in order to secure neutrality. He died from a heart attack in Stockholm on 6 October 1946 while stepping off a tram at the Ålstens Gård station. He was succeeded as party chairman and Prime Minister by Minister of Education Tage Erlander, who held both offices concurrently until 1969, completing most of Hansson's legacy. Per Albin Hansson, seen often as the most successful Prime Minister in Swedish history. He is interred in Norra Begravningsplatsen in Stockholm.

Private life
Per Albin Hansson was married to Elisabeth Fryckberg between 1918–1926. Before marrying her, he lived with Sigrid Vestdahl and fathered one child by her in 1908. He continued his relationship with Vestdahl after his marriage to Fryckberg. He lived with and supported both families financially. This was most likely known to the press, but little was written about it. It appears both women were aware of the situation.

In popular culture
In the Swedish television movie Four Days that shook Sweden – The Midsummer Crisis 1941 from 1988, he is played by Swedish character actor Ernst-Hugo Järegård.

In the World War II Grand Strategy game Hearts of Iron IV made by Paradox Interactive, he appears as Sweden's leader.

See also
Sweden during World War II
Skåne Line

Notelist

References

External links

1885 births
1946 deaths
Politicians from Malmö
Prime Ministers of Sweden
Swedish Ministers for Defence
Leaders of the Swedish Social Democratic Party
Swedish people of World War II
World War II political leaders
Members of the Andra kammaren
Swedish democracy activists
Swedish Lutherans
Members of the Executive of the Labour and Socialist International
Burials at Norra begravningsplatsen
Great Depression in Sweden
20th-century Lutherans